Killarney Golf and Fishing Club is a private - members owned golf club on the shore of Lough Leane just west of Killarney, County Kerry, Ireland. The club has 2 18-hole golf courses, Killeen and Mahony's Point & a 9-Hole Course called Lackabane. It also has full practice facilities including covered driving bays, pitch, chipping & putting Greens The Killeen Course measures 7,031 yards and plays to a par of 72. It has been the venue for the European Tour's Irish Open in 1991, 1992, 2010 and 2011 and the Curtis Cup in 1996.

References

External links
Killarney Golf Club

Golf in County Kerry
Golf clubs and courses in the Republic of Ireland
Curtis Cup venues
Sport in Killarney
Sports clubs in County Kerry
Irish Open (golf) venues